Michael Roach is a teacher of Buddhism.

Michael Roach may also refer to:
Michael Roach (musician) (born 1955), Piedmont Blues guitarist living in England
Michael Roach (footballer) (born 1958), champion Australian rules footballer with the Richmond Football Club
Michael Roach (soccer) (born 1988), American association football player
Mickey Roach (1895–1977), American ice hockey player
Mike Roach (1869–1916), baseball player

See also
Michael Roche (disambiguation)